Lisa Bowerman (born 1 February 1962) is a British actress. She is best known for portraying Sandra Mute, the paramedic, in the BBC One medical drama Casualty, in the first two series (1986–1987). She also starred as Professor Bernice Summerfield in many Doctor Who Big Finish Productions audio plays, as well as directing many series for the company.

Career
Bowerman trained at the Bristol Old Vic Theatre School and was a regular in the first two series of BBC medical drama Casualty playing Sandra Mute, the show's first female paramedic. Her other television work includes: Dodgem, The Count of Solar, Grange Hill, The Vision Thing, Doctors, McCallum, Bad Girls and Night and Day. In 2007 she guest-starred as the home secretary's PA in Spooks, and returned to Casualty for a one-episode cameo role as a patient. In 2011 and 2012, she appeared in five episodes of Coronation Street as solicitor Jennifer Lingwood.

In July 2014 Bowerman directed episodes 1 and 2 of the audio drama series Osiris by Everybodyelse Productions. In 2018 she directed The Coming of the Martians (also known as The War of The Worlds), starring Colin Morgan, Nigel Lindsay and Ronald Pickup, for Sherwood Sound Studios. In 2022 she directed When Michael Met Benny, a podcast drama for Average Romp Productions.

She has recorded plays for BBC Radios 3 & 4, and has worked extensively in theatre. She plays the role of Julianne Wright in The Archers.

Doctor Who and Bernice Summerfield
Bowerman has had a connection with the British science fiction television series Doctor Who—and its assorted spinoffs—since 1989. For the BBC, she played the role of Karra in Survival (the final serial in the original run of Doctor Who in 1989), and voiced Saruba Velak in Dreamland (a 2009 animated serial connected to the revived series). In November 2013 she appeared in the one-off 50th anniversary comedy homage The Five(ish) Doctors Reboot.

Since 1998, she has played companion Bernice Summerfield in the Big Finish Productions Doctor Who audio plays. She appeared in six Doctor Who audio plays opposite Sylvester McCoy as the Seventh Doctor and Sophie Aldred as Ace, as well as four boxed sets opposite her partner David Warner as the 'Alternate Doctor'; she has starred in over 150 audio plays and audiobooks based solely on Bernice. Bowerman has also either directed or played supporting roles in numerous other Big Finish audio series: the latter roles have included Ruby in the Sapphire & Steel stories "Water Like a Stone", "Cruel Immortality" and "Second Sight", Murash in "I, Davros: Guilt" and Ellie in Jago & Litefoot.

Filmography

Television

References

External links

1962 births
English television actresses
Living people